Rakim Hasheem Allen (December 9, 1991 – September 12, 2022), better known by his stage name PnB Rock, was an American rapper, singer, and songwriter. He gained a large following in 2016 with his song "Selfish", which peaked at number 51 on the US Billboard Hot 100, as well as his feature on the song "Cross Me" by Ed Sheeran, alongside Chance the Rapper. He also provided uncredited vocals on XXXTentacion's hit single "Changes", which reached the top 20 on the same chart. 

He released two studio albums, Catch These Vibes (2017) and TrapStar Turnt PopStar (2019), the latter of which reached the top five on the Billboard 200 chart. PnB Rock was chosen as part of the 2017 XXL Freshman Class.

On September 12, 2022, PnB Rock was shot and killed at Roscoe's House of Chicken 'N Waffles during a robbery in Los Angeles.

Early life
Rakim Hasheem Allen was born on December 9, 1991, in the Germantown neighborhood of Philadelphia, Pennsylvania, to a Muslim family. Allen's father was murdered when he was three years old. He was primarily raised by his mother. In his teen years, he lived in Northeast Philadelphia. He grew up listening to artists such as rapper 2Pac and R&B group Jodeci. 

At age 13, Allen was sent to a youth detention program for committing robberies and fighting in school. When he turned 19, he was sentenced to 33 months in prison for drug possession and other crimes. Allen was homeless for a short period after being released from prison. He never finished high school. Allen later adopted the stage name PnB Rock, which paid homage to Pastorius and Baynton, a street corner near where he grew up in Germantown.

Career
In June 2014, PnB Rock released his debut mixtape, Real N*gga Bangaz. He wrote the mixtape while he was incarcerated. In 2015, PnB Rock signed a record deal with Atlantic Records, and his first project under the label was the release of his third mixtape RnB3. In June 2016, he released the single "Selfish", which peaked at number 51 on the US Billboard Hot 100. In October 2016, Rolling Stone included him in their list of "10 New Artists You Need to Know".

In January 2017, he released his second retail mixtape album, GTTM: Goin Thru the Motions, through Atlantic Records and Empire Distribution. The album debuted at number 28 on the US Billboard 200 chart. In April 2017, he contributed to the soundtrack of The Fate of the Furious with two singles: "Gang Up" with Young Thug, 2 Chainz, and Wiz Khalifa and "Horses" with Kodak Black and A Boogie wit da Hoodie. In June 2017, PnB Rock was named as one of the ten members of XXL's "2017 Freshman Class" along with A Boogie wit da Hoodie, Playboi Carti, Ugly God, Kyle, Aminé, MadeinTYO, Kamaiyah, Kap G, and XXXTentacion.

His debut album TrapStar Turnt PopStar was released in May 2019. PnB Rock and Chance the Rapper were featured on Ed Sheeran's song "Cross Me" from Sheeran's album No.6 Collaborations Project. In January 2020, PnB Rock released the track "Ordinary" featuring late rapper Pop Smoke. In January 2021, he featured for the late rapper King Von, on a song titled "Rose Gold". In February 2022, PnB Rock released the mixtape SoundCloud Daze which featured various artists including Pasto Flocco, Iayze and Yung Fazo. He independently released  "Luv Me Again" in September 2022, which was the last single he released during his lifetime.

Death 

On September 12, 2022, PnB Rock was robbed and fatally shot at Roscoe's House of Chicken 'N Waffles near Main Street and Manchester Avenue in South Los Angeles. He saved his partner, with whom he had a two-year-old daughter, by throwing her under a table.

On September 28, 2022, the LAPD confirmed that an unnamed 17-year old juvenile had been arrested in connection to the murder, and a 32-year old woman, Shauntel Trone, had been arrested for accessory to murder. The following day, a third suspect was arrested: the 17-year old's father, Freddie Trone. The juvenile and Freddie Trone were charged with one count of first-degree murder, two counts of second-degree robbery, and one count of conspiracy to commit robbery. If convicted of the murder charge, the juvenile faces up to life imprisonment with the possibility of parole. Freddie Trone faces life imprisonment without the possibility of parole, or the death penalty.

Discography

Studio albums
Catch These Vibes (2017)
TrapStar Turnt PopStar (2019)

See also
 List of murdered hip hop musicians

References

External links
 

1991 births
2022 deaths
2022 murders in the United States
21st-century African-American male singers
21st-century American rappers
African-American male rappers
African-American male singer-songwriters
African-American Muslims
American contemporary R&B singers
American hip hop singers
Atlantic Records artists
Deaths by firearm in California
Rappers from Philadelphia
Singer-songwriters from Pennsylvania